The SNECMA M45, also called the SNECMA Mars, was a turbojet engine designed and produced by SNECMA in France during the late 1950s and early 1960s. The M45 was the precursor to a family of turbojet and turbofan engines, culminating in the collaborative Rolls-Royce/SNECMA M45H, high bypass turbofan engine.

Variants
Data from: Aircraft Engines of the World 1964/65
M45A A compact moderate thrust turbojet.
M45A-3for civil applications.
M45AFAft-fan turbofan engine intended for civil aircraft.
M45BTurbojet with afterburning for military aircraft.
M45B-3With afterburner.
M45F-3Civil non-afterburning for small airliners / business jets.
M45L-1Lightweight civil version for small business jets.
SNECMA/Bristol Siddeley M45GAfterburning turbofan engine for AFVG, from the civil M45F.

Specifications (M45A)

See also

References

Axial-compressor gas turbine engines
Snecma aircraft engines